Riverstown is a village in County Sligo, Ireland

Riverstown may also refer to:

Canada
Riverstown, Ontario
Republic of Ireland
Riverstown (near Birr), a village on the County Offaly/County Tipperary border

See also
Riverstown Demesne, an 18th-century house near Glanmire in County Cork, Ireland